Jaynet Désirée Kabila Kyungu (born 4 June 1971) is the daughter of Laurent-Désiré Kabila, the former president of the Democratic Republic of Congo and twin sister of Joseph Kabila, the former President. Kabila was elected as a member of the Parliament of the Democratic Republic of the Congo in 2011, the same year as her other brother Zoé Kabila. Document leaks in 2016 revealed that she is a part-owner of a major Congolese telecom company through offshore subsidiaries.

Early life
Jaynet Kabila and her twin brother, Joseph Kabila were born on 4 June 1971 to Sifa Mahanya and Laurent-Désiré Kabila. Although her father would eventually become president of the country, at the time of Jaynet Kabila's birth, Laurent Kabila was a struggling rebel leader at the nadir of his power.

Career
Jaynet Kabila first became publicly prominent in 2011 when she was elected as a deputy to the Congolese National Assembly, representing Kalemie as an independent.

Despite her generally low profile, Kabila is a powerful figure in Congolese politics, as the owner of Congolese media conglomerate . and as of 2015 has been described as the most influential member of her brother's entourage.

Offshore holdings

On 3 April 2016, the Panama Papers investigative reporting project revealed that Kyungu hired Panamanian law firm Mossack Fonseca to create a company called Keratsu Holding Limited in Niue on 19 June 2001, just a few months after her brother became president. According to the documents released, Kyungu was a co-director of Keratsu Holding Limited with Congolese businessman Kalume Nyembwe Feruzi, the son of a close ally of Kyungu's father, Laurent-Désiré Kabila.

Keratsu Holding Limited owns a 19 percent stake in Congolese Wireless Network SPRL, which in turn has a 49 percent stake in Vodacom Congo SPRL.

References

1971 births
Living people
Members of the National Assembly (Democratic Republic of the Congo)
Daughters of national leaders
Democratic Republic of the Congo twins
Democratic Republic of the Congo Anglicans
People from South Kivu
People named in the Panama Papers
21st-century Democratic Republic of the Congo people